"Finché non mi seppelliscono" is a song by Italian singer Blanco. It was written by Blanco and Michelangelo, and produced by Michelangelo.

The song was included in Blanco's debut album Blu celeste and released as a radio single on 12 November 2021 by Island Records. The song peaked at number 3 on the FIMI single chart and was certified double platinum in Italy.

Personnel
Credits adapted from Tidal.
 Michelangelo – producer, composer
 Blanco – associated performer, author, vocals

Charts

Weekly charts

Year-end charts

Certifications

References

2021 singles
2021 songs
Island Records singles
Blanco (singer) songs
Songs written by Blanco (singer)